Representing Border is a regional television current affairs programme, produced by ITV Tyne Tees & Border, covering political issues from Holyrood, Westminster and local government, affecting Dumfries and Galloway and the Scottish Borders.

The programme was launched on Monday 6 January 2014, as part of an enhanced sub-regional service for southern Scotland, introduced to address concerns over coverage of the Border region since the company's operations were merged with those of ITV Tyne Tees in 2009.

Representing Border is produced from ITV Tyne Tees & Border's Scottish Parliament bureau in Edinburgh and airs on Tuesday, Wednesday and Thursday nights, following the late-night Border news bulletin. The programme is not broadcast in Cumbria, where networked programming continues to air.

References

External links

2014 Scottish television series debuts
2010s Scottish television series
2020s Scottish television series
English-language television shows
ITV regional news shows
Scottish Borders
Scottish television news shows
Television shows produced by Border Television